Eureka Stockade is a 1907 Australian silent film about the Eureka Rebellion. It was the second feature film made in Australia, following The Story of the Kelly Gang.

It was made by George Cornwell, and his brother Arthur, who was a motor mechanic.

Synopsis
The surviving seven-minute fragment (original length unknown) shows street scenes of Ballarat is believed to be part of the 1907 film, the second feature film made in Australia (after the 1906 production, The Story of the Kelly Gang). Other scenes in the lost reels of the film were believed to have included gold seekers leaving London; the issuing of licences; the rush at Canadian gully; the arrival of the first women at the goldfields; licence hunting; diggers chained to logs and rescued by mates; the murder of Scottish gold digger James Scobie; diggers burning Bentley's Hotel; the Rebellion; Peter Lalor addressing the miners; burning the licenses; building the stockade; troops storming the stockade; the stockade in ruins; and a look at Ballarat 55 years later

Release
The film was first screened in the Athenaeum Hall, Melbourne on 19 October 1907. It impressed critics of the time and was found to be a stirring portrayal of the events surrounding the Eureka Stockade, but failed to connect with audiences during the two weeks it was screened. The Cornwells wound up their film company in March 1908. The movie was forgotten until Ealing Studios decided to make a film about the story in 1946.

The surviving  of the 35mm film (5 mins @ 18fps) is stored at the National Film and Sound Archive.

See also
 List of Australian films before 1910

References

External links
 
 Eureka Stockade at National Film and Sound Archive
Eureka Stockade at Ausstage

1907 films
Australian black-and-white films
Australian silent films
Films set in colonial Australia
Silent drama films